The 2001 San Diego State Aztecs football team represented San Diego State University in the 2001 NCAA Division I-A football season. The Aztecs, led by head coach Ted Tollner, who was fired after the season, and they played their home games at the Qualcomm Stadium.

Schedule

References

San Diego State
San Diego State Aztecs football seasons
San Diego State Aztecs football